KBM-7 cells are a chronic myelogenous leukemia (CML) cell line used for biomedical research. Like all cancer cell lines, it is immortal and can divide indefinitely. A unique aspect of the KBM-7 cell line is that it is near-haploid, meaning it contains only one copy for most of its chromosomes. Human chromosomes are typically diploid, meaning that there are two copies of each chromosome.

Origin
KBM-7 cells were derived from a 39-year-old man with chronic myeloid leukemia in blast crisis. The original cell line contained both near haploid and hyperdiploid clones. Subsequent subcloning yielded a pure near-haploid cell line. Genome analysis has revealed that besides the disomic chromosome 8, a 30 megabase fragment of chromosome 15 is present in two copies. Like other CML cells lines (e.g., K562) KBM-7 cells are positive for the Philadelphia chromosome harboring the BCR-ABL oncogenic fusion. KBM-7 cells have been reprogrammed to yield the HAP1 cell line which is also monosomic for chromosome 8.

Cultivation and applications
KBM-7 cells grow in suspension and are maintained in Iscove's Modified Dulbecco's Medium (IMDM) supplemented with 10% fetal bovine serum. They divide approximately every 24 hours.

KBM-7 has found applications in a variety of genomic research studies; the cell line has been examined in gene silencing experiments, been reprogrammed to become a stem cell line, and served as a test model for novel drug candidates.

Significance 
One method of studying gene function involves "knocking out" the gene by inducing a mutation. This causes the resulting gene product to be nonfunctional, and researchers can then see how this effects the cell's function as a whole. Many gene editing procedures have very low efficiency, and often both copies of mammalian chromosomes must be knocked out in order to see a phenotypic effect. Having a near-haploid cell line such as KBM-7 greatly increases the efficiency of these studies because there is only one gene that must be knocked out.

References

External links
Cellosaurus entry for KBM-7

Human cell lines